Zhou Hui (born 1989) is a Chinese badminton player. Born in Lin'an City, Zhou joined the Zhejiang Province badminton team in 2000, and she was chosen to join the national junior team in 2005. She competed at the 2009 East Asian Games in Hong Kong, and won gold for the women's team event. She won her first international individual title at the 2010 India Grand Prix tournament. Zhou retired from the international competitions in 2014, and later works as coach and teacher in Zhejiang Gongshang University.

Achievements

BWF Grand Prix 
The BWF Grand Prix had two levels, the BWF Grand Prix and Grand Prix Gold. It was a series of badminton tournaments sanctioned by the Badminton World Federation (BWF) which was held from 2007 to 2017.

Women's singles

  BWF Grand Prix Gold tournament
  BWF Grand Prix tournament

References

External links 
 

1989 births
Living people
Badminton players from Zhejiang
Chinese female badminton players
Chinese badminton coaches